is a 1966 Japanese drama film directed by Yoshishige Yoshida. It is based on Yasunari Kawabata's novel The Lake.

Plot
Miyako, comfortably married to businessman Yuzo Mizuki, is having an affair with Kitano, who is himself engaged. She allows Kitano to take nude pictures of her, but the photos end up in possession of Ginpei, who had been waywarding her. Miyako agrees to meet Ginpei, who threatens to inform her husband of the affair, in Katamayazu, Lake Shibayama. She is followed by Kitano and still later Kitano's fiancée Machie.

Ginpei has prints made of the negatives at a local photo shop in Katamayazu. The shop owner blackmails Miyako, but while he is satisfied with money, Ginpei wants to possess Miyako, whom he feels attracted to since he first saw her with Kitano. At the same time, he confesses that he might be less in love with Miyako herself than with her image. After sleeping with Ginpei, she pushes him off a cliff. When she returns to her hotel room, she is confronted with her husband, who has been informed of the affair and her whereabouts by Kitano. On the way back to Tokyo with her husband, Miyako spots Ginpei, who has survived, on the train. She explains to Ginpei that her attempt to kill him did not happen out of hatred. Ginpei turns away from her, leaving her behind alone.

Cast
 Mariko Okada as Miyako 
 Shinsuke Ashida as Yuzo
 Shigeru Tsuyuguchi as Ginpei
 Tamotsu Hayakawa as Kitano
 Keiko Natsu as Machie

References

External links
 
 

1966 films
1966 drama films
Japanese drama films
Films based on Japanese novels
Films based on works by Yasunari Kawabata
Films directed by Yoshishige Yoshida
1960s Japanese films